Tai Chi Chasers (Taegeuk Cheonjamun; , Tai Chi Senjimon,  Taichi Chasers lit. "1000 Characters of Tai Chi" in Asian territories; also known as Taegeuk Kids on KBS World) is an animated action-adventure and a Manhwa anime television series produced by JM Animation and Toei Animation. The series, inspired by East Asian mythology, revolves around the protagonist Rai, a child who gains supernatural abilities and becomes involved in a long-running armed conflict between two ethnic groups, the Tigeroids and the Dragonoids.

Tai Chi Chasers originally aired on KBS 1TV from 29 April 2007 to 20 January 2008. A localised Cantonese version of the series aired on TVB Jade in Hong Kong from 13 August 2009 to 1 January 2010, and an English language localisation was distributed through 4Kids Entertainment in the United States, airing on Toonzai from 17 September 2011 until 2 June 2012. The English language localisation was further adapted into Hebrew in Israel, where it was aired by Arutz HaYeladim. The Korean version was adapted by Thailand in 2008.. The French dub was adapted by 4Kids Entertainment and Iconix Entertainment from 2011-2013 under the channel Canal J.

Premise and plot 
Tai Chi Chasers is set in a fantasy world that is influenced by East Asian mythology. Within this fantasy world, two ethnic groups, the protagonist Tigeroids and the antagonist Dragonoids are engaged in a long-running armed conflict over Tai Chi cards, a set of 500 magical artefacts that both groups seek for their own purposes.

The plot revolves around the main character Rai, a child who discovers that he is descended from the Tigeroids after his community is attacked. He therefore possesses various magical abilities that all Tigeroids possess. Rai becomes a combatant in the Tigeroid armed forces, and enhances his magical abilities. He also becomes a member of an elite group of combatants, known as the Tai Chi Chasers. 

Tai Chi Chasers utilizes Korean hanja to represent the various magical abilities and artefacts present throughout the series. In the English language version, distributed by 4Kids Entertainment, the hanja characters are referred to both by their Korean pronunciations and their English language translations.

Production 
Tai Chi Chasers was produced by KBS in association with Toei TV. The series was distributed and localised by 4Kids Entertainment in the United States, airing on Toonzai from 17 September 2011 to 2 June 2012. The series has a total of 39 episodes, broadcast across three seasons, with 13 episodes in each season.

The third season of the English language localisation of Tai Chi Chasers was cancelled in 2012 due to the bankruptcy of 4Kids Entertainment and its subsidiary, 4Kids Productions. This led to the sale of 4Kids Entertainment's assets in June 2012. Tai Chi Chasers was also adapted into Hebrew in Israel, where it aired on Arutz HaYeladim under the name Tai Chi Champions.

Characters

Tigeroids
Rai (Korean: 라이)
voiced by Sohn Jeong Ah (Korean)
voiced by Erica Schroeder (English)
Sena (Korean: 세나)
voiced by Lee Hyeon Seon (Korean)
voiced by Suzy Myers (English)
Finn (Korean: 핀)
voiced by Oh Kirugyon (Korean)
voiced by Tom Wayland (English)
Donha (Korean: 돈하)
voiced by Sa Sonun (Korean)
voiced by Marc Thompson (English)
Tori (Korean: 또리)
voiced by Kim Seo Young (Korean)
voiced by Veronica Taylor (English)
Hak (Korean: 하크)
voiced by Eun Young Seon (Korean)
voiced by David Wills (English)
Elder Komorka (Korean: 코모루카)
voiced by Kayzie Rogers (English)
Masked Warrior/Laura (Rai's mother)
Hannah (Korean: 한나)
voiced by Eden Gamliel (English)
General Aidan (Korean: 아단)
voiced by Marc Thompson (English)
Asty (Korean: 아스티)
voiced by Amanda Schuckman (English)
Cloda (Korean: 크로더)
voiced by Amanda Schuckman (English)
Straw (Korean: 스트라)
General Zushen (Korean: 즈센)
voiced by Mike Pollock (English)
Elder Sid (Korean: 시드)
voiced by Marc Thompson (English)
Elder Pyron (Korean: 파이론)

Dragonoids
Luka (Korean: 루카)
voiced by Wayne Grayson (English)
Jahara (Korean: 자하라)
voiced by Erica Schroeder (English)
Garnia (Korean: 가르니아)
voiced by Marc Thompson (English)
Ave (Korean: 아브)
voiced by Wayne Grayson (English)
General Vicious (Korean: 비샤스)
voiced by Darren Dunstan (English)
Duran (Korean: 드란)
General Mischka (Korean: 미슈카)
voiced by Marc Thompson (English)
Jakata (Korean: 쟈카타)
voiced by Gary Mack (English)
Lita (Korean: 리타)
Yanima (Korean: 야니마)
voiced by Jason Griffith (English)
Terra (Korean: 테라)
voiced by Amy Palant (English)
Dag (Korean: 다그)
Lord Gherba/Luva (Rai's father)
Emperor Diga (Korean: 디가)
Phoebe (Korean and Cantonese versions only) (Korean: 비비)
Master Loren/Sensei (Korean version only)
General Bob (Korean version only)
General Jarrell (Korean version only)
Dragonoid Elders (Korean version only)

Other
Kyo
Yuri
Orphanage Kids (Korean version only)
Spirit Prince (Korean version only)
Spirit Princess (Korean version only)
Spirit King (Korean version only)

List of episodes

Season 1

Season 2
{|class="wikitable" style="width:100%; margin:auto; background:#FFF" 
|- style="border-bottom: 3px solid #FFA040" 
! style="width:3em;" | No. 
! English TitleKorean Title 
! style="width:12em;" | Original air date 
! style="width:12em;" | American air date 
{{Episode list
| EpisodeNumber   = 14
| Title           = Perfect Pets
| RAltTitle       =  ()
| RTitle          = 
| OriginalAirDate = 
| AltDate         = 11 February 2012
| ShortSummary    = Upon seeing his new team's reaction, General Mischka, the ruthless replacement for General Vicious, sarcastically says that he was expecting a "friendlier welcome." When Ave refuses to obey General Mischka, due to his young age and small size, Mischka tortures Ave with the Tai Chi Eum''' sound, which amplifies the sound around Ave's ears by 10 times. Mischka then tauntingly wags his finger at Ave, while he screams in agony, until Ave gives in. Later, the dragon Duran recalls Mischka calling him a "useless reptile." Feeling useless to the Dragonoids, Duran jumps ship and goes through a lot of city troubles until a girl, Yuri, rescues him, naming him "Blackie." Hak thinks that he doesn't belong with the Chasers anymore, and leaves the team. He ends up in the street like a stray cat. Yuri finds him and takes him home. Yuri says she has another pet "friend" for him, Duran. It is later revealed that both Hak and Duran were friends before the Dragonoid-Tigeroid War began. They quickly become friends again. Soon afterward, both the Dragonoids and the Tigeroids figure out that their respective friend is missing, and look for them. Jahara leaves the Luftdrake to find Duran. At Yuri's house both pets fight over getting Yuri's attention, fearing they might end up on the streets again if they do not. Jahara finds them and tries to kill Hak. However, Duran stalls her, telling Jahara about his friendship with Hak, and defends Hak until the Chasers rescue him. Finn realizes that there is a Tai Chi card nearby. However, Yuri has the card, and it is the "like" card. After Rai obtains the card, Yuri runs away from both pets, feeling afraid. The Dragonoid and Tigeroid teams fight after Yuri leaves, and the Chasers win, which allows both "pets" go to their right home. For failing to kill Hak, General Mischka decides to punish Jahara, since she did not return with the Tai Chi card, but instead brought the "pathetic creature" (Duran). Mishka coldly attacks Jahara with a powerful Tai Chi blast, which knocks her to the floor in pain. However, this angers Duran, since he believes that Jahara saved his life. Later, Jahara talks to Duran alone, telling him that she likes having him around, even though he is annoying.
| LineColor       = FFA040
}}

|}

Season 3

See also
 aeni

 References 

 External links 
 Tai Chi Chasers at the encyclopedia of the Anime News Network
 Tai Chi Chasers at the 4Kids website
 Tai Chi Chasers''  on Amazon

2007 South Korean television series debuts
2008 South Korean television series endings
Japanese children's animated action television series
Japanese children's animated adventure television series
South Korean children's animated action television series
South Korean children's animated adventure television series
Martial arts television series
Card games in anime and manga
Toei Animation television
Animated television series about orphans